John William Coppinger (January 12, 1852 – December 8, 1900) was an American politician and lawyer.

Coppinger was born in Alton, Illinois. He went to the Alton Public Schools. Coppinger also went to St. Mary's College in Perryville, Missouri and to the University of Notre Dame. He was admitted to the Illinois bar in 1872. Coppinger served as mayor of Alton and was a Democrat. Coppinger served in the Illinois House of Representatives from 1887 to 1889 and in the Illinois Senate from 1891 to 1895. He also served as the United States consul in Toronto, Ontario, Canada. Coppinger died at his home in Alton, Illinois after suffering kidney problems.

Notes

External links

1852 births
1900 deaths
People from Alton, Illinois
University of Notre Dame alumni
Illinois lawyers
Mayors of places in Illinois
Democratic Party members of the Illinois House of Representatives
Democratic Party Illinois state senators
American consuls
19th-century American politicians
19th-century American lawyers